Frank Patrick is the name of:

 Frank Patrick (running back) (1915–1992), American football player
 Frank Patrick (quarterback) (born 1947), American football quarterback
 Frank Patrick (ice hockey) (1885–1960), Canadian ice hockey player, coach and manager